B. L. Verma is an Indian education administrator. He is the founder Vice Chancellor of University of Kota, Rajasthan. He joined University of Kota on 25 August 2003. He is Chairman of Vidysthali Public School.

References

Living people
Academic staff of the University of Kota
Year of birth missing (living people)